C. abbotti may refer to:

Chlorocnemis abbotti, a damselfly species
Cinnyris sovimanga, the souimanga sunbird, a bird species
Citharichthys abbotti, the Veracruz whiff, a flatfish species
Coracina abbotti, the pygmy cuckooshrike, a bird species